HipSoft is a Redmond, Washington-based developer of casual video games founded in 2002 by three of the original founders of Monolith Productions: Brian Goble, Garrett Price, and Bryan Bouwman. HipSoft has made over a dozen games, many of which have become popular in the casual gaming industry. Its games have been translated into many different languages and are distributed and sold worldwide through websites and retail outlets. All of the games are available for Windows and most for Mac OS X, and are being developed by partner companies for the Nintendo DS, mobile phones and other platforms.

The company's casual game Build-a-lot has been rated 4.5 out of 5 stars and "E" for "Everyone".

Awards and nominations
RealArcade Developer Contest (Digby's Donuts)
RealArcade Word Game of the Year (Flip Words)
Big Fish Games Action/Arcade Game of the Year (Build-a-lot)
RealArcade Strategy Game of the Year (Build-a-lot)
Interactive Achievement Awards Nomination for 2008 Downloadable Game of the Year (Build-a-lot)

References

External links
 
 Interview: Brian Goble of HipSoft from Gamezebo
 Hipsoft's profile from MobyGames
 Brian Goble profile from the Blood Wiki

Big Fish Games games
Browser-based game websites
Companies based in Redmond, Washington
Monolith Productions
Video game companies of the United States
Video game development companies
Video game companies established in 2002
2002 establishments in Washington (state)
Privately held companies based in Washington (state)